PRC-US Ambassadorial Talks (Chinese: 中美大使级会谈) were a series of meetings between the ambassadors of People's Republic of China and the United States from 1954 to 1970 when there were no diplomatic relations between the two countries. 

The first was held in Geneva, Switzerland, August 1st, 1955, between Wang Bingnan, PRC ambassador to Poland and U. Alexis Johnson, US ambassador to Czechoslovakia. Since 1958, the meetings began to be held in Myślewicki Palace, Warsaw, Poland between Wang Guoquan, PRC ambassador to Poland and Jacob D. Beam, United States Ambassador to Poland. In 1961, Wang Bingnan rejected Beam's suggestion that China consider allowing privately sent food parcels from America. After 1970, US began to contact PRC formally and substituted the meetings with other channels.

See also 
 China–United States relations
 Ping-pong diplomacy
 Shanghai Communiqué
 Joint Communiqué on the Establishment of Diplomatic Relations
 History of China–United States relations

References

China–United States relations
20th century in Geneva
20th century in Warsaw
20th-century diplomatic conferences
1970s in international relations
1960s in international relations
1950s in international relations